Bukumbi is a village on the south shore of Lake Victoria in Tanzania, situated in Mwanza Region.

In 1883 the White Fathers, a group of missionaries led by Léon Livinhac, established a Catholic mission called Kamoga at Bukumbi.
The location was chosen as being less disturbed by Buganda, to the north of the lake.
In the late 1880s it was the location of the Catholic seminary headed by John Joseph Hirth.

References
Citations

Sources

Populated places in Mwanza Region
White Fathers missions